Mora is the seventh canton in the San José province of Costa Rica.

Toponymy
Originally designated as Pacaca, a cacique name, the canton's name was changed to Mora in honor of Juan Rafael Mora Porras (1814-1860), the second President of Costa Rica.

History
The canton of Pacaca was established by a decree of 25 May 1883.

Geography 
Mora has an area of  km² and a mean elevation of  metres.

The Virilla River establishes the northern boundary of the canton, with the Grande de Tárcoles River delineating its far western limit. The Chucás, Quebrada Grande, Viejo and Tabarcia rivers mark the canton's western boundary; the Jorco, Tabarcia and Negro rivers, the southern boundary; and a series of foothills rising into the Cerros de Escazú delineate the canton's eastern border.

Districts
The canton of Mora is subdivided into six districts
 Colón
 Guayabo
 Tabarcia
 Piedras Negras
 Picagres
 Jaris

Demographics 

For the 2011 census, Mora had a population of  inhabitants.

Transportation

Road transportation 
The canton is covered by the following road routes:

References

Cantons of San José Province